Arthur Erskine of Blackgrange (died 1571) was a Scottish courtier.

Career
He was a son of John Erskine, 5th Lord Erskine and Margaret Campbell.

He became an equerry or master of the stable to Mary, Queen of Scots. John Knox noted that he accompanied her during her formal Entry to Edinburgh in September 1561. Knox says the queen was given a Bible during the pageant, and quickly passed it to Erskine, who was a Catholic.

In 1562 he married Magdalen Livingstone, a lady in waiting to Queen Mary, and daughter of Alexander Livingston, 5th Lord Livingston and Agnes Douglas. Mary bought him a horse for £40 in April 1562. In December 1566 she gave him £60 Scots, from her income known as the "Thirds of Benefices".

The escape from Holyrood Palace
After the murder of David Rizzio on 9 March 1566, Mary escaped from Holyrood Palace the next day at midnight and rode behind Arthur Erskine to Seton Palace and then to safety at Dunbar Castle. The description of the murder of Rizzio made by the Earl of Bedford and Thomas Randolph says that Lord Robert Stewart and Arthur Erskine tried to resist the murderers when they entered the queen's chamber.

Anthony Standen wrote that Mary was mounted behind Erskine, Darnley was on another horse, and there were six in the party riding to Dunbar, including the Laird of Traquair, and a chamberer or servant for Mary.

Later career
Arthur Erskine and Magdalen Livingstone stayed at Dryburgh on the 9 and 10 of October 1566 with his kinsman David Erskine, Commendator of Dryburgh before riding to Jedburgh to join Mary, Queen of Scots. Mary then rode from Jedburgh to Hermitage Castle to see the Earl of Bothwell.

As one of the masters of the queen's stable, Erskine kept an account with Robert Abercromby, an Edinburgh craftsman who made saddles and reins.

He died in 1571.

After his death, Magdalen Livingstone married James Scrimgeour of Dudhope in 1577. Mary, Queen of Scots, was displeased by the news of this marriage.

References

1571 deaths
Court of Mary, Queen of Scots
Arthur
Younger sons of barons